Jacques Hérold (born Herold Blumer; 10 October 191011 January 1987) was a prominent surrealist painter born in Piatra Neamț, Romania.

Biography
Considered one of the most important late-period Surrealist painters, Hérold was born in a Jewish family in Piatra Neamț, Romania. He spent most of his childhood in the Danubian port city of Galați, where his father was making and selling candy. Between 1925 and 1927 he studied at a School of Fine Arts in Bucharest, against his father's will. After 2 years, he abandoned the Art Academy in 1929 and instead started working at an architecture bureau. In the same year he briefly contributed to a few Romanian Surrealist revues.

In 1930, he moved to France and, thanks to a fake ID, changed his name from Herold Blumer (his birth name) to Jacques Hérold. He settled in Paris, where he maintained a close friendship with Constantin Brâncuși, for whom he also worked as a chef or even secretary. He also met Surrealist painter Yves Tanguy, thanks to whom Hérold was allowed in Breton's group, participating at games and contributing with paintings that were held in high esteem by the likes of Raoul Ubac or Andre Breton himself.

After the tensioned period of World War II, he managed to have his first solo exhibition in 1947. Starting with this year's "Exposition Internationale du Surréalisme", he had an active presence in all the important Surrealist exhibitions worldwide. After 1951 (when he also departed from Breton's group), his style increased in abstraction and would be associated later with Lyrical abstraction and Tachisme. In 1958 he published the book Maltraité de peinture and received the Copley Foundation prize. In 1959 he had an exhibition at the Tate Gallery from London. In 1972, a monographic exhibition at l'Abbaye de Royaumont. In 1986, one year before his death, he exhibited works at the Venice Biennale.

During his lifetime, Hérold has done cover artwork and illustrations for more than 80 books by the likes of Gherasim Luca, Tristan Tzara, Francis Ponge, Julien Gracq, Marquis de Sade, Michel Butor, Alain Bosquet, Gellu Naum, Ilarie Voronca, Claude Sernet, etc. In 1995, Art critic Sarane Alexandrian published  the essay book Jacques Hérold. Étude historique et critique.

Individual exhibitions

 1947 Paris, Galerie Cahiers d’Art  
 1948 New York, Galerie Julius Carlebach  
 1949 San Francisco, M. H. de Young Memorial Museum  
 1951 Bruxelles, Galerie Ex-Libris  
      Wuppertal, Galerie Parnass  
 1952 Francfort, Zimmergalerie Franck  
 1954 Paris, Galerie Furstenberg  
 1957 Bruxelles, Palais des Beaux-Arts  
 1959 Paris, La Cour d’Ingres  
 1960 Wuppertal, Galerie Parnass  
 1965 Paris, Au Pont des Arts  
 1966 Marseille, Galerie Garibaldi  
      Milan, Galleria Milano  
 1968 Lacoste, Galerie Les Contards  
 1970 Paris, Au Pont des Arts 
      Turin, Galerie Il Fauno
 1971 Bonnieux, Galerie du Haut Bonnieux  
      Montauban, Maison du Peuple  
 1972 Paris, Galerie de Seine 
      Asnières-sur-Oise, Abbaye de Royaumont  
 1973 Helsinki, Galerie Christel  
 1974 Milan, Galleria Annunciata  
 1975 Beyrouth, Gallery One  
 1977 Paris, Galerie de Seine  
 1978 Paris, Galerie des Grands Augustins  
 1979 Paris, Galerie B.I.M.C.  
 1980 Monte Carlo, Galerie Le Point 
      Paris, Galerie de Larcos    
 1981 Florence, Institut Français    
      Florence, Galerie Saletta Gonnelli   
 1982 Rome, Centre culturel français  
      Rome, Studio Zebra  
 1984 Séoul, Galerie de Séoul  
 1985 Paris, Galerie Patrice Trigano  
      Paris, Galerie Arenthon  
 1987 Saint-Brieuc, Centre d’Action Culturelle  
 1990 Paris, Galerie La Pochade  
 1996 Thonon-les-Bains, Maison des Arts : Jacques Hérold - Le surréalisme et après  
 2006 Paris, Galerie Marion Meyer et Galerie 1900 - 2000  
 2010 Marseille, Musée Cantini : Jacques Hérold et le surréalisme.

Main group exhibitions

 1931 Paris, Galerie de la Renaissance : Salon « 1940 »  
 1936 Paris, Salon des Surindépendants  
 1938 Paris, Salon des Surindépendants  
 1939 Paris, Salon des Indépendants  
      Paris, Galerie contemporaine : Le rêve dans l’art et la littérature  
 1944 Paris, Salon d’Automne : Groupe Surréaliste  
 1945 Paris, Salon d’Automne  -
      Paris, Salon des Surindépendants  -
      Bruxelles, Galerie des Éditions La Boétie : Surréalisme  
 1946 Paris, Galerie Denise René, D’Ingres à nos jours   
      Paris, Galerie Pierre : Hommage à Antonin Artaud  
      Paris, Salon des Surindépendants  
 1947 Paris, Galerie Maeght : Le Surréalisme en 1947 
      Prague, Topicov Salon : Surrealismo internazionale  
      Paris, Salon des Surindépendants  
 1948 Paris, Galerie Nina Dausset : Le Cadavre exquis, son exaltation
 1949  Paris, Galerie Nina Dausset : Surréalisme, documents inédits  
 1950 Malmoe : Phases  
      Londres, Institut of Contemporary Arts : London-Paris  
 1951 Liège, Musée de Liège : La peinture française au Musée de Liège, nouvelles acquisitions  
      Tokyo, Exposition internationale  
 1952 Saarebrücken, Saarland Museum : Surrealistische Malerei in Europa  -
 1953 Ostende, Kursaal : Art Fantastique  
 1954 Paris, Studio Facchetti : Phases  
      Lima, Galeria de Lima : Pinturas Surrealistas  
 1955 Paris, Galerie Creuze : Phases de l’art contemporain
 1957 Otterlo, Museum Kröller-Müller, et Liège, Musée des Beaux-Arts : Collection Urvater  
      Paris, Salon de Mai (et les suivants jusqu’en 1968)  
 1958 Paris, Musée d’Art Moderne  
 1959 Milan, Galerie Schwarz : Mostra surrealista internazionale  
      Paris, Galerie Daniel Cordier : Exposition internationale du Surréalisme (EROS)  
 1960 New York, D’Arcy Galleries : International Surrealist Exhibition
 1961 Besançon, Palais Granvelle : Surréalistes et précurseurs  
 1962 Paris, Galerie La Cour d’Ingres : Lam, Paalen, Hérold
 1963 Paris, Galerie Le Point Cardinal : Collages surréalistes
 1964 Paris, Galerie Charpentier : Le Surréalisme. Sources, Histoire, Affinités  
      Gand, Musée des Beaux-Arts : Figuration Défiguration - La figure humaine depuis Picasso  
 1965 Paris, Galerie L’œil : L’écart absolu  
      Sao Paulo, Museu de Arte Moderna, VIIIe Biennale : Surrealismo e Arte fantastica  
 1966 Rio de Janeiro, Museu de Arte Moderna : Surrealismo e Arte fantastica.  
      Tel Aviv, Musée d’art moderne : Le Surréalisme  
      Berne, Kunsthalle : Phantastische Kunst Surrealismus   
 1967 Cuba, Musée de La Havane, Sélection du Salon de Mai    
 1968 Knokke - Le Zoute, Kursaal : Trésors du Surréalisme  
 1969 Avignon, Palais des Papes : L’œil écoute  
 1971 Bordeaux, Musée des Beaux-Arts : Surréalisme  
 1972 Munich, Haus des Kunst : Der Surrealismus  
      Paris, Musée des Arts décoratifs : Le Surréalisme  
 1973 Paris, Galerie de Seine : Philippe Soupault, Collection fantôme  
 1974 Milan, Galerie Annunciata : Maestri del Surrealismo  
      Château de Saint-Cirq-Lapopie : Aspects du Surréalisme  
 1976 Paris, Galerie des Grands Augustins : Rituel surréaliste  
      Bruxelles, Galerie Govaerts : Les demeures d’Hypnos  
 1978 Zurich, Kunsthaus, Le musée en tiroirs. 
 1979 Paris, Galerie de Seine et Bruxelles, Galerie Isy Brachot : Le Musée volé de Michel Lancelot
 1980 Marseille, Musée Cantini : Cantini 80  
 1981 Lyon, ELAC : Permanence du regard surréaliste 
      Paris, Musée National d’Art Moderne - Centre Georges Pompidou : Paris  - Paris, 1937-1957  
 1982  Paris, Galerie de Seine : Surréalisme et Abstraction 1921-1960
 1983 Paris, Galerie 1900-2000 : Trajectoires 1905 – 1983
 1984 Washington, Hirshorn museum : Artistic collaboration in the 20th Century
 1985 Liège, Musée d’Art Moderne : Voir avec Michel Butor  
 1986 Venise : Biennale de Venise  -
      Marseille, La Vieille Charité : La Planète affolée  
      Paris, Galerie Artcurial : L’aventure surréaliste autour d’André Breton  
 1989 Milan, Palazzo Reale : I Surrealisti, a cura di Arturo Schwarz /  
 1991 Paris, Musée National d’Art Moderne - Centre Georges Pompidou : André Breton, la beauté convulsive. 
 2011 Saint-Louis, Alsace, Espace d'Art Contemporain Fernet-Branca : Chassé-Croisé Dada-Surréaliste 1916–1969.

Works in French and foreign museums
 Brussels, Royal Museums of Fine Arts of Belgium : Le nu fou, oil on canvas, 1964.  
 Céret, Musée d’Art Moderne : Les poussées contradictoires, oil on canvas, 1957.  
 Jérusalem, The Israel Museum : Sans titre, oil on cardboard, 1934.  
 Liège, Musée d’Art Moderne : L’incendie, oil on panel, 1948.  
 Marseille, Musée Cantini : Les Têtes, oil on canvas, 1939 / Sans titre, oil on canvas, 1940 / Dessin collectif, 1940 / Two drawings of playing cards for Le Jeu de Marseille, 1941 / La terre, la nuit, oil on canvas, 1965.   
 New York, Museum of Modern Art : Cadavre exquis, 1934.  
 Paris, Musée National d’Art Moderne, Centre Georges Pompidou : Le rouge en flamme, le noir en voûte, oil on panel, 1947 / Cadavre exquis, 1941. Paris,  
 Musée d’Art Moderne de la Ville de Paris : Une flamme sur la nuque, oil on canvas, 1966.  
 Rome, Galleria Nazionale d’Arte Moderna e Contemporanea : L’amour dans la forêt, oil on canvas, 1976.  
 Valence, Musée des Beaux-Arts : Poussières d’Afrique, oil on canvas, 1961.

References and sources
References

Sources

 Benezit Dictionary of Artists, 2006, site Oxford Index (subscription or library membership required)

External links
 Jacques Hérold, 1910-1987 Galerie Alain Paire
 Bande Annonce de Jacques Hérold, Seven Doc, YouTube
 Jacques Hérold (1910-1987) The Surrealism Website
 Historical Dictionary of Surrealism, Keith Aspley, 2010, p. 248, Jacques Hérold, books google

1910 births
1987 deaths
People from Piatra Neamț
Romanian Jews
Romanian artists
20th-century Romanian painters
Modern painters
Modern printmakers
Romanian printmakers
Romanian surrealist artists
20th-century Romanian sculptors
Abstract expressionist artists
Abstract painters
Art Informel and Tachisme painters